Womanhandled is a 1925 American silent comedy film produced by Famous Players-Lasky and distributed through Paramount Pictures. It is based on a short story by Arthur Stringer and stars Richard Dix and Esther Ralston.

Plot 
Bill Dana (Richard Dix) meets Mollie (Esther Ralston) in the park and is smitten. Mollie expresses admiration for the rugged men of the west, and Bill decides to go to his Uncle Lester's (Edmund Breese) ranch to man up and deserve Mollie's love. Upon arrival he finds that the west isn't quite so wild anymore, with cowboys herding cows in cars and his uncle spending a lot of time on the golf course. Bill settles in to enjoy his stay, but after a while Mollie announces she is coming for a visit. Bill and Uncle Lester cook up a plan to pass as rugged for a day or so, forcing the cowboys onto horses and dressing the servants up as Native Americans, and Mollie is fooled. When she decides to stay longer, Bill puts on a show of being too rugged. He eats with atrocious table manners and picks a fight with a farmhand. Mollie decides she preferred him un-rugged.

Cast

Preservation
A print of Womanhandled is held at the Library of Congress.

References

External links

Lobby poster

1925 films
American silent feature films
Films directed by Gregory La Cava
Famous Players-Lasky films
Films based on short fiction
Silent American comedy films
1926 comedy films
1926 films
American black-and-white films
Surviving American silent films
1925 comedy films
1920s American films